Åryd may refer to:
Åryd, Karlshamn Municipality, a village in Karlshamn Municipality, Sweden
Åryd, Växjö Municipality, a village in Växjö Municipality, Sweden